Ian Barker (born 10 August 1966 in Cardiff) is a British sailor. He won a silver medal in the High Performance Dinghy class at the 2000 Summer Olympics with Simon Hiscocks. He lives in Christchurch, England. He coached the Irish 49er team for Rio 2016 Olympics.

References

External links
 
 
 

1966 births
Living people
Sportspeople from Cardiff
British male sailors (sport)
Olympic sailors of Great Britain
Sailors at the 2000 Summer Olympics – 49er
Olympic silver medallists for Great Britain
Olympic medalists in sailing
Medalists at the 2000 Summer Olympics
Welsh Olympic medallists